

For the purposes of this article, the Jersey City area extends North to Edgewater (the Northern end of the line along the Hudson River), South to Bayonne and includes Kearny Junction and Harrison but not Newark. Many routes east of Newark are listed here.

Railroad Name Abbreviations 
B&O: Baltimore and Ohio Railroad
CNJ: Central Railroad of New Jersey
CRCX: Conrail Shared Assets Operations
DL&W: Delaware, Lackawanna, and Western Railroad
Erie: Erie Railroad
LV: Lehigh Valley Railroad
NYC: New York Central Railroad
NYO&W: New York, Ontario and Western Railway
NYS&W: New York, Susquehanna and Western Railway
PATH: Port Authority Trans-Hudson
PRR: Pennsylvania Railroad
RDG: Reading Railroad

1833
November 28: The Paterson and Hudson River Railroad (Erie) opens at Marion Junction, ending at the New Jersey Railroad (PRR).

1834
 September 15: The New Jersey Railroad, which 38 years later would become the Pennsylvania Railroad (PRR), begins regular trips from Newark to Jersey City's first terminal. The route crosses the Passaic River on the Newark, over Centre Street Bridge to the Hackensack River and onto Jersey City, on the West side of the Palisades. It uses temporary tracks and horse-drawn trains around and over the Bergen Hill, to the Terminal on the Hudson at Paulus Hook for transfer to ferries bound for New York City.

1836
 The Morris Canal is extended from Newark through Jersey City.

1837
 The New Jersey Railroad (PRR) cut through the Palisades opens; the Paterson and Hudson River Railroad (Erie) also uses it.

1838
 December 2: The New Jersey Railroad (PRR) switches from horse to steam power.

1858
 The Pennsylvania Railroad builds a five-track passenger station and ferry at Hudson Street.

1861
January 28: The Long Dock Company (Erie) finishes its tunnel through the Palisades, bypassing the PRR cut.
March 14: The New York and Bull's Ferry Railroad (NYC) is chartered and buys the Hoboken and Hudson River Turnpike.

1862
March 8: The New York and Bull's Ferry Railroad (NYC) changes its name to the New York and Fort Lee Railroad.
May: The Pavonia Ferry (Erie) opens.

1864
July 29: The CNJ's Jersey City extension opens, from about Spring Street in Elizabeth to the Jersey City terminal, including a long bridge across Newark Bay.

1868
The Passaic and Harsimus Line (PRR), opens for a new freight terminal at Harsimus Cove.

1869
July 23: The full length of the Newark and New York Railroad (CNJ) opens, from Broad St terminal in Newark to the CNJ at Communipaw.

1870
February 22: The New Jersey Railroad (PRR) builds a new bridge over the Passaic River, cutting the distance through Newark and Harrison. Some passenger trains continue to use the old alignment, the Centre Street Branch.
December 2: A frog war begins between the Erie and DL&W at the west end of the Erie's tunnel where the new Boonton Branch would join.
December 14: The DL&W begins running passenger trains on its Boonton Branch.
The New York and Fort Lee Railroad (NYC) opens.
The PRR leases the United New Jersey Railroad and Canal Company.

1871
January 9: The frog war between the Erie and DL&W ends, with the frog being placed to allow DL&W Boonton Branch trains to run through the Erie's tunnel.

1872
August 23: Trains are first to run along the Erie's Newark and Hudson Railroad from Newark through their tunnel to Jersey City.

1873
 The Pennsylvania Railroad constructs a new passenger ferry terminal with 12 tracks and six platforms. The wooden terminal is built on piers over the water.
 The Hudson Connecting Railway, part of the New Jersey Midland and later NYS&W, completed to West End Junction with Erie connection to Marion Junction.

1877
May 12: The DL&W opens its new tunnel through the Palisades, ending its trackage rights through the Erie's tunnel. Included with the tunnel are western approaches to the DL&W mainline and Boonton Branch; the former includes a new bridge over the Hackensack River, south of the old one (which is then used only for the Erie's Newark and Greenwood Lake Branches). The new alignment at first crosses the New Jersey Midland Railroad (NYS&W) at grade.

1883
 The National Docks Railway is constructed to connect the National Storage Company docks at Black Tom with the Pennsylvania Railroad in Jersey City.  The PRR controls and operates the railroad until 1889, when control passes to the New York Central Railroad after completion of the New Jersey Junction Railroad.  In 1894, the Lehigh Valley Railroad acquired half interest and obtains full control in 1900.

1884
 The West Shore Railroad's (NYC) tunnel through the Palisades to Weehawken Terminal opens.
 August 4: The Pennsylvania Railroad passenger and ferry terminal at Exchange Place burns as a result of an explosion in a gas reservoir underneath the station.

1885
 December 5: NYC leases the West Shore Railroad for 475 years from January 1, 1886, with the privilege of an additional 500-year term.

1886
 June 30: The New Jersey Junction Railroad (NYC) leases  of the New York and Fort Lee Railroad. The rest later disappears in the West Shore Railroad's (NYC) Weehawken yard.
 July 1: NYC leases the New Jersey Junction Railroad for 100 years, with the option of another 100-year term.

1887
 May: The New Jersey Junction Railroad (NYC) opens for freight.
 June: The New Jersey Junction Railroad (NYC) opens for passengers.
 October: The Lehigh Valley Railroad settles a long legal battle with the Central Railroad of New Jersey, opening the way to build a Jersey City terminal on land originally purchased in 1872 for the New Jersey West Line Railroad.

1889
 The Lehigh Valley Railroad constructs its freight terminal on the south side of the Morris canal basin at South Cove, adjacent to the Central Railroad of New Jersey terminal.  The LVRR reaches its new terminal over CNJ tracks on a five-year lease.

1890
 The Lehigh Valley Railroad constructs the Edgewater Railway, on the north side of the Morris Canal basin.

1891
 The Pennsylvania Railroad (PRR), rebuilds the passenger ferry terminal to replace the old terminal which was partially destroyed by fire.

1892
 The Lehigh Valley Railroad opens its bridge across Newark Bay.  The LVRR connects with the National Docks Railway east of the bridge in order to reach the LVRR terminal.

1894
 May 15: The New York, Susquehanna and Western Railway Edgewater Tunnel through the Palisades opened to freight traffic. The mile-long tunnel took 18 months to construct and provides the NYS&W access to its own waterside terminal in Edgewater. The NYS&W had previously used the DL&W terminal in Hoboken.

1897
The Hoboken Manufacturers Railroad opens.
The National Docks and New Jersey Junction Connecting Railway (LV + NYC) is completed. This line was mainly a short tunnel under the Pennsylvania Railroad to connect the New Jersey Junction Railroad (NYC) with the National Docks Railway (LV + NYC). For nine years the PRR fought the construction of the line both in the courts and on the ground, at one point dumping stone into the tunnel and turning fire hoses onto the construction crews.

1900
 The Greenville and Hudson Railway (LVRR) completes construction of a line roughly parallel to the National Docks Railway from the Newark Bay bridge to the Jersey City terminal. Upon completion, the Lehigh Valley Railroad has a wholly owned route from the coal fields of Pennsylvania to its terminal in Jersey City.

1908
February 26: The Hudson and Manhattan Railroad (PATH) opens from 19th Street Manhattan to Hoboken Terminal.

1909
July 19: The Hudson and Manhattan Railroad (PATH) opens from Hudson Terminal (World Trade Center) to Exchange Place.
August 2: The Hudson and Manhattan Railroad (PATH) opens its connection from Exchange Place, north towards Hoboken Terminal.

1910
November 27: The Pennsylvania Tunnel and Terminal Railroad (PRR) opens from Kearny Junction into New York Penn Station. Manhattan Transfer opens.
The Penhorn Creek Railroad's (Erie) four-track cut through the Palisades (Bergen Arches) opens, just south of the Erie's two-track tunnel, including a western approach through Secaucus.

1911
 March 14: The New Jersey Shore Line Railroad (NYC) opens from the West Shore Railroad's (NYC) Weehawken yard to the NYS&W at Shadyside, about .85 mi.
 May 16: Cars first move on the New Jersey Shore Line Railroad (NYC).
 October 1: The Hudson and Manhattan Railroad (PATH) is extended through Jersey City to Manhattan Transfer.
 November 26: The Hudson and Manhattan Railroad (PATH) is extended from Manhattan Transfer to Newark Park Place.

1937
June 20: Manhattan Transfer closes and the Hudson and Manhattan Railroad (PATH) is realigned to Newark Penn Station.

1939
August 1: The NYS&W begins bus service from Susquehanna Transfer to Times Square via the Lincoln Tunnel.

1959
Weehawken Terminal closes. The Weehawken is the last ferry to the terminal on March 25, 1959 at 1:10 am, ending 259 years of continuous ferry service.

1960
The Erie Railroad trains shift to Hoboken Terminal, as the company merges with the Lackawanna Railroad.
Erie trains began moving to Hoboken in Oct 1956 for off peak and weekend trains.  Peak hour trains began using Hoboken on March 25, 1957 with the exception of Nyack and NYS&W trains which continued to use the few remaining tracks in Jersey City.  NYS&W trains were later discontinued and Nyack trains used a backup move to reach Hoboken until they were discontinued in 1966.

1967
 With the Aldene Plan, Communipaw Terminal, the last Jersey City terminal closes. Lehigh Valley trains now terminate at Newark Penn Station, as do Reading Railroad trains. CNJ Trains run over LV from Roselle Park, NJ to Newark, NJ then on the PRR and terminate at Newark Penn Station, and use a small yard in Harrison. It was not until the late 1990s, when the midtown direct service was instituted, that NJ TRANSIT ran a service of some Raritan Valley trains to Hoboken (Penn Sta. New York).

1983
NY Waterway re-institutes ferry service across the Hudson.

1994
A short partially elevated track, known as the Marion Running Track, is built to connect the Passaic and Harsimus Line towards Kearny with the Northern Branch.  This provided the Northern Branch with a direct connection to other lines heading west and south at Marion Junction.

1999/2000
Conrail Shared Assets Operations created. CSX River line is shifted to the re-newed Northern Running track to North Bergen Yard.

2000
The Hudson–Bergen Light Rail opened to the public on April 15, 2000 with an initial operating (MOS) The extension to southern terminal at 8th Street opened January 31, 2011.

2001
NJ Transit renovates Bergen Tunnels.

2003
Secaucus Junction opened on December 15, 2003.

2009
On July 26, 2009, NJ Transit began shuttle service to the Meadowlands station at the Meadowlands Sports Complex.

2010
On October 7, 2010, New Jersey governor Chris Christie announced that the Access to the Region's Core, which included a new right-of way  from Secaucus Junction under the Hudson Palisades and Hudson River to Midtown Manhattan was officially cancelled.

2019
ExpressRail at Port Jersey opened on June 17, 2019.

See also
List of Hudson County railroad terminals
North River (Hudson River)
Communipaw Terminal
Weehawken Terminal
Pavonia Terminal
Exchange Place (Jersey City)
Hoboken Terminal
Bergen Hill
List of crossings of the Hackensack River
List of bridges, tunnels, and cuts in Hudson County, New Jersey
List of crossings of the Lower Passaic River
Rail freight transportation in New York City and Long Island
 Timeline of Jersey City, New Jersey history

Sources
Poor's and Moody's railroad manuals
New-Jersey Railroad Improvements, New York Times February 23, 1870, page 5
Local News in Brief, New York Times November 28, 1870, page 8
Almost a Riot, New York Times December 3, 1870, page 1
Local News in Brief, New York Times December 15, 1870, page 8
Local News in Brief, New York Times January 10, 1871, page 8
New-Jersey, New York Times August 24, 1872, page 8
The New Bergen Tunnel, New York Times May 12, 1877, page 10

Notes

External links
 This article, by Dick Greene, was first published in “The Old Station Timetable” in Fall 1987.

 
Jersey City